Meagan Kelly McCray (born June 17, 1987) is an American former soccer goalkeeper who last played for Valur of Úrvalsdeild in Iceland.

Early life and education 
McCray was born in Greenbrae, California and attended San Marin High School.  She later attended Santa Clara University and played for the Broncos women's soccer team for four years.

Playing career

Club 
While enrolled at Santa Clara University, McCray appeared for Women's Premier Soccer League team Sonoma County Sol.  She was on the club roster in 2006 and she appeared in 2 league matches in 2007.

McCray signed as a free agent with FC Gold Pride of Women's Professional Soccer in 2009.  She didn't appear in a match for the club.

After being released by FC Gold Pride, McCray joined Washington Freedom for the 2010 season.  She would appear in 1 league game.

McCray moved to Iceland in 2011 to play for Úrvalsdeild team Valur.

International 
McCray was a member of a number of different youth national teams for the United States.

References

External links 
 US Soccer biography
 
 
 
 
 Santa Clara Broncos biography

1987 births
Living people
Santa Clara Broncos women's soccer players
American women's soccer players
FC Gold Pride players
Women's association football goalkeepers
People from Greenbrae, California
Women's Professional Soccer players